"Piranha Brothers" is a Monty Python sketch that was first seen in the first episode (titled "Face the Press") of the second series of Monty Python's Flying Circus. Originally broadcast on television on 15 September 1970, the premise is a BBC current affairs documentary programme, inexplicably titled Ethel the Frog, retrospectively covering the exploits of the brothers Doug and Dinsdale Piranha. The sociopathic criminals employed a combination of "violence and sarcasm" to intimidate the London underworld and bring the city to its knees. Dinsdale is also described as being afraid of "Spiny Norman", a gigantic imaginary hedgehog whose reported size varied based on Dinsdale's mood. The threat of Norman affected Dinsdale so severely that it led him to launch a nuclear weapon attack on an airplane hangar (where Norman was thought to have resided according to Dinsdale) at Luton International Airport (then Luton Airfield) on 22 February 1966. During the end of the sketch, which also ends the episode, the creature is apparently revealed as real and appearing (in the form of a Terry Gilliam animation bellowing "Dinsdale!") beside various English landmarks as the credits roll.

Background and details 
The sketch constitutes a loose pastiche of the real-life story of the Kray twins, gangsters who maintained an underground criminal outfit based in the East End of London in the 1950s and 1960s. Doug and Dinsdale Piranha were loosely based on Reggie and Ronnie Kray, and the policeman who pursued them, Harry "Snapper" Organs, was loosely based on the policeman who led the investigation against the Krays, Detective Superintendent Leonard "Nipper" Read. However, the Piranhas' described methods seem to resemble more closely those used by the rival Richardson Gang and their associate "Mad" Frankie Fraser.

The sketch is introduced by a piece of music (the Intermezzo from Sibelius's Karelia Suite) which was used for many years, until 1992, to introduce the Thames Television (and previously Associated-Rediffusion and Rediffusion London) current affairs series This Week.

A slightly re-worked version of the sketch also appeared on the album Another Monty Python Record where, in addition to Doug's wide repertoire of sarcasm, hyperbole is also included. Rather than nuke Luton Airport, the brothers are said to have napalmed Cheltenham. This version ends with one of the Piranha Brothers' associates interrupting the recording and "accidentally" scratching the record, causing a continuous loop in the album's run out groove. An almost word-for-word transcript appeared in Monty Python's Big Red Book.

Influence 
A heavy metal group took its name, Ethel the Frog, from this sketch. The band is best known for taking part in the Metal for Muthas multi-artist compilation album, released in 1980.

See also 
Reggie and Ronnie Kray
Bruce George Peter Lee

References 
The Monty Python script

Monty Python sketches
1970 in British television
Works about the Kray twins